Esporte Clube XV de Novembro, commonly known as XV de Caraguatatuba, is a Brazilian football club based in Caraguatatuba, São Paulo state.

History
The club was founded on February 18, 1934. They finished as the Campeonato Paulista Segunda Divisão runners-up in 1997.

Stadium
XV de Caraguatatuba play their home games at Estádio XV de Novembro. The stadium has a maximum capacity of 5,600 people.

References

Association football clubs established in 1934
Football clubs in São Paulo (state)
1934 establishments in Brazil